Guadalupe Etla is a village and municipality in the Mexican state of Oaxaca. The municipality has a total area of 17.86 km ².

Guadalupe Etla is part of the region of the central valleys of Oaxaca.

Etla means "abounding beans" and comes from the Nahuatl words E ~ "bean" and Tia ~ "abundance"; and Guadalupe in honor of the Virgin of Guadalupe.

According to INEGI the total population of Guadalupe Etla in 2010 was 2433.

References

Municipalities of Oaxaca